The 2022–23 Milwaukee Panthers men's basketball team represent the University of Wisconsin–Milwaukee during the 2022–23 NCAA Division I men's basketball season. The Panthers, led by first-year head coach Bart Lundy, play their home games at the UW–Milwaukee Panther Arena as members of the Horizon League. They will also play select games, including the Cream City Classic multi-team event, at the on-campus Klotsche Center.

Previous season
The Panthers finished the 2021-22 season in ninth place in the Horizon League with a record of 10-22, including 8-14 in conference play. They lost in the opening round of the Horizon League tournament to eighth-seeded UIC.

Offseason

Departures

Incoming transfers

2022 recruiting class

Preseason
The Panthers were picked to finish in ninth place in the Horizon League in the coaches' poll, receiving a total of 132 points.

Roster

Schedule and results

|-
!colspan=12 style=| Regular season 

|-
!colspan=9 style=| Horizon League tournament

|-
!colspan=9 style=| College Basketball Invitational

|-

Source

References

Milwaukee Panthers men's basketball seasons
Milwaukee
Milwaukee
Milwaukee
Milwaukee